Sbordoniella indagi is a species of beetle in the family Carabidae, the only species in the genus Sbordoniella.

References

Trechinae